The Champ is a 1979 American neo noir drama sports film directed by Franco Zeffirelli and a remake of the 1931 Academy Award-winning film of the same name directed by King Vidor. It stars Jon Voight as Billy Flynn, a former boxer who attempts to support his son (Ricky Schroder) and reconcile with his ex-wife (Faye Dunaway) by fighting in the ring again.

The film is the last featuring Joan Blondell to be released during her lifetime.

Plot 
Ex-boxing champion Billy Flynn lives in the city of Hialeah, Florida, where he is trying to settle down as a horse trainer after giving up his boxing title. A boxer propositions that Billy enter a match with him in the future. Billy shows up at the gym with his son T.J., who calls his father Champ. When he learns the man has not arrived, Billy angrily storms out of the gym, leaving his son behind. T.J. later finds him drunk inside a bar. When he takes him home, neighbor Josie asks about his drunken state on the street, and T.J. tells her that Charlie and his friends bought him four beers as a celebration.

The next morning, Billy announces that he won $6,400 gambling and uses it to buy T.J. his own horse named She’s a Lady. Lady is entered in a race, but suddenly collapses, scraping her leg. Annie, Billy's wife from whom he had separated seven years ago, had placed a bet on the horse and arrives after Lady's fall. Billy explains that he told T.J. that Annie was dead and that she had deserted them. Annie invites T.J. to her cruise ship.

Annie's current husband confronts Billy to convince him to tell T.J. that Annie is his mother. Billy tells him that because she was not there for T.J., he has no mother. Billy loses a gamble on T.J.'s horse and is told by Whitey to either give him Lady or $2,000 in cash. Annie gives Billy the money, but Whitey takes the horse instead. After assaulting Whitey in response and attacking anyone who tries to stop him, including a police officer, Billy is arrested and taken into custody, where he tells T.J. that he is to live with Annie. T.J. refuses to leave, and Billy slaps him in a fit of rage. At her home, Annie tries to comfort T.J., but accidentally tells him that she is indeed his mother. T.J. refuses to accept her as his mother, and Annie is distraught.

When Billy is released, he hugs T.J. at a stadium and promises to never leave him ever again. Annie visits Billy and says that she wants him to explain why she wasn't there for T.J. After a fight, Billy allows her back into his life as a friend. To make amends with his son, Billy explains his promise to fight in the ring after Jackie warns him about his age and constant headaches, which could be fatal when boxing. Jackie reluctantly agrees to train Billy to fight again.

The night of the fight arrives. From his dressing room, T.J. sees that Billy's opponent is much stronger than Billy, but Billy wins the first two rounds. He later receives many blows to the head and is weakened. The doctor examines Billy during a break and explains that if Billy suffers more damage, the fight will have to be stopped. Billy continues to receive sharp blows but finds enough stamina to knock out his opponent. Billy faints on the way back to his dressing room, and he calls for T.J. to ask him if he is happy that his father won. T.J. replies that "the champ always comes through." Billy then dies from his injuries. T.J., unaware that his father is dead, tries frantically to rouse him. Jackie tells T.J. that his father is dead. T.J. says goodbye to Billy and is embraced by Annie.

Cast 
 Jon Voight as Billy Flynn ("Champ")
 Faye Dunaway as Annie Phillips
 Ricky Schroder as Timothy Joseph "T.J." Flynn
 Jack Warden as Jackie
 Joan Blondell as Dolly Kenyon
 Arthur Hill as Mike Phillips
 Strother Martin as Riley
 Elisha Cook Jr. as Georgie
 Stefan Gierasch as Charlie Goodman
 Mary Jo Catlett as Josie
 Kristoff St. John as Sonny
 Dana Elcar as Hoffmaster, an attorney
Robert Redford turned down the lead role. Ryan O'Neal signed to play the lead but wanted his son Griffin as T.J. After the director refused, claiming that Griffin was too old, O'Neal withdrew from the project. The filmmakers conducted a six-month talent search with thousands of applicants to cast the role of T.J., and Schroder was chosen immediately after his audition.

Production 
Director Franco Zeffirelli said that he was inspired to remake the original film after seeing it again on television. It had first made an impression on him as a child because of the parallels between his own troubled youth and that of the boy in the story.

Reception

Critical response 
At review aggregator Rotten Tomatoes, the film holds has an approval rating of 40% based on 25 reviews, with an average rating of 5.2/10. At Metacritic, the film has a weighted average score of 38 out of 100 based on eight critics, indicating "generally unfavorable reviews."

Michael Booth of The Denver Post wrote positively of the film: "Director Franco Zeffirelli makes beautiful pictures; from Shakespeare to the life of St. Francis. In 'The Champ,; he imbues Florida with some oldtime movie magic, retelling the tale of a washed-up former boxer trying to shed booze and gambling to win back his son."

Time Out London was critical of the film, calling it "a pointless update of King Vidor's '30s weepie."

In The New York Times, critic Vincent Canby strongly panned the film, stating that "the most offputting thing about such canny, tear-stained movies as 'The Champ' is not their naïveté but their unholy sophistication. These movies don't mean to deal with the world as it really is, but as it should be, a place where there's no pile-up of emotional garbage too big that it can't be washed clean by a good cry. My problem with 'The Champ' is that I didn't cry. The garbage accumulated."

In a positive review, Variety's Dale Pollock wrote: "Hardly anyone can resist a cute kid, and with Ricky Schroder, 'The Champ' has the most irresistible moppet seen on the screen in decades. Franco Zeffirelli makes an auspicious debut on these shores with his first American film, bolstered by earnest performances from Jon Voight and Faye Dunaway."

Gene Siskel of the Chicago Tribune awarded the film two and a half stars out of four and questioned the point of remaking the original, adding: "Of course that question would be of secondary importance if 'The Champ' were an effective tearjerker. But it's not. For no apparent reason, the original simple story has been lengthened a full 35 minutes. With catastrophe now piled upon catastrophe, 'The Champ' seems to be begging us to cry."

Charles Champlin of the Los Angeles Times wrote in a generally positive review that "Zeffirelli has made 'The Champ' work again, on his and its extravagant terms. It requires, makes no mistake, a willing surrender to those terms of sentimental romance and is less piquantly seasoned with wry worldliness than 'Heaven Can Wait,' for example, whose romantic idealism it shares. But, with due allowances, 'The Champ' is a strongly affecting experience for those who want to be moved."

Gary Arnold of The Washington Post opined that the film "slogs on for about two reels too many, concluding on a note of utterly contrived tragedy that should make just about everyone feel wretchedly deceived."

Clyde Jeavons of The Monthly Film Bulletin wrote: "Whether the unabashed sentimentality of Zeffirelli's remake of King Vidor's 1931 was deliberate or a misinterpretation of mood, one thing is certain; rarely has the screen been quite so awash with tears for so little apparent reason."

Film historian Leonard Maltin awarded the picture 1.5 out of a possible 4 stars, calling it "Hopeless...Voight acts too smart for us to believe he's a dumb pug, while Dunaway acts as if she wants to bed down with their kid; Schroeder cries (and cries) convincingly, but this still isn't exactly Zeffirelli's finest hour."

The Champ has been listed among the most depressing films, and the final scene has been used in psychology experiments to elicit strong emotional responses. In 1988, psychologists conducted a study involving more than 250 film clips shown to 500 people. The study concluded that the last three minutes of The Champ, in which T.J. sees his father win his comeback fight and then die, elicited the saddest response from a majority of the subjects.

Box office 
At the American box office, the film performed modestly at first but went on to become MGM's greatest international hit in 14 years, grossing $30.4 million in the U.S. and Canada and more than $35 million elsewhere, including more than $10 million in Japan. By September 1979, The Champ had registered as MGM's fourth-greatest success in its history.

Awards 
Ricky Schroder won the Golden Globe Award for Best New Male Star of the Year in a Motion Picture. Jon Voight was nominated for Drama at the Golden Globes, but lost to Dustin Hoffman for his role in Kramer vs. Kramer. Dave Grusin's score was also nominated for an Academy Award.

Release 
The film was released on DVD on May 5, 2015 as part of the Warner Archive Collection.

References

External links 
 
 
 
 

1979 films
1970s sports drama films
Remakes of American films
American sports drama films
American boxing films
Films scored by Dave Grusin
Films about children
Films about dysfunctional families
Films about grieving
Films directed by Franco Zeffirelli
Films about gambling
United Artists films
Metro-Goldwyn-Mayer films
Films with screenplays by Walter Newman (screenwriter)
American neo-noir films
1979 drama films
1970s English-language films
1970s American films